Portugala is a monotypic genus of land snails native to the western Iberian Peninsula in Portugal and Galicia (Spain).

It has a single species, Portugala inchoata.

Gallery

References

 Gittenberger, E. (1980). Three notes on Iberian terrestrial gastropods. Zoologische Mededelingen, 55 (17): 201-213. Leiden.
 Bank, R. A. (2017). Classification of the Recent terrestrial Gastropoda of the World. Last update: July 16th, 2017

External links
 Caro, A., Neiber, M. T., Gómez-Moliner, B. J. & Madeira, M. J. (2019). Molecular phylogeny and biogeography of the land snail subfamily Leptaxinae (Gastropoda: Hygromiidae). Molecular Phylogenetics and Evolution. 139: 1-11

Hygromiidae
Fauna of Portugal